Daniel Leon Kratzer (born July 7, 1949) is a former American football player and coach. Kratzer served as the head football coach at Ohio Northern (1984–1985), Hastings (1990–1994), Lindenwood (1995–2000), and South Dakota Mines (2005–2011), compiling a career college football coaching record of 90–116–1.

Playing career
Kratzer, a wide receiver, played high school football in Lathrop, Missouri before playing college football at Northern Arizona and Missouri Valley in the early 1970. Kratzer holds the NAIA record for average yards per catch for a season with 30.63, on 30 catches for 919 yards, set in 1970.

Professionally, he was an eighth round draft pick of the Cincinnati Bengals in the 1972 NFL draft, but did not play for them; he only played in a single game in 1973 for the Kansas City Chiefs.

Coaching career
Kratzer was an assistant under Sam Wyche at Indiana University Bloomington in 1983 before being named the head football coach at Ohio Northern University. He later was the third head football coach at Lindenwood located in St. Charles, Missouri, and he held that position for six seasons, from 1995 until 2000. His overall coaching record at Lindenwood was 29–35. Prior to that, he also served as head coach for three Missouri high schools for seven total seasons, head coach at Ohio Northern for two seasons, earned two conference championships during his five years at Hastings. His longest tenure was his last serving as head coach at the South Dakota School of Mines for seven years, ending in 2011 and marking SDSM&T's transition to NCAA Division II.

Head coaching record

College

References

External links
 

1949 births
Living people
American football wide receivers
Hastings Broncos football coaches
Indiana Hoosiers football coaches
Kansas City Chiefs players
Kent State Golden Flashes football coaches
Lindenwood Lions football coaches
Miami RedHawks football coaches
Missouri Valley Vikings football coaches
Missouri Valley Vikings football players
Ohio Northern Polar Bears football coaches
South Dakota Mines Hardrockers football coaches
High school football coaches in Missouri
People from Kearney, Missouri
Coaches of American football from Missouri
Players of American football from Missouri